The Acoustic EP is the second EP from The Early November, recorded shortly before the band's first full-length CD and released in 2003.

Track listing
(all songs written by Arthur Enders)
 "Ever So Sweet" – 4:15
 "I Want to Hear You Sad" – 3:24
 "All We Ever Needed" – 2:27
 "Sunday Drive" – 3:46
 "Come Back" – 2:47
 "Make It Happen" – 3:21
 "Every Night's Another Story" – 2:40

Credits
Arthur 'Ace' Enders – vocals, guitar

References

Acoustic EP, The
Acoustic EP (The Early November album), The
Acoustic EP (The Early November album), The